Let's Dance 2021 is the sixteenth season of the Swedish celebrity dancing show Let's Dance. The season premiered on 20 March 2021 and ended on 15 May 2021, and broadcast on TV4. New presenters for this season are Petra Mede and David Lindgren.

Contestants
Singer Carola Häggkvist was the first celebrity contestant to be announced on 18 February. On 27 April, Carola Häggkvist decided to quit the show, citing health concerns as a reason. On 28 April, TV4 announced that Keyyo who was eliminated on 24 April, would return to replace Carola Häggkvist.

Scoring chart

Red numbers indicate the lowest score of each week.
Green numbers indicate the highest score of each week.
 indicates the couple that was eliminated that week.
 indicates the couple received the lowest score of the week and was eliminated.
 indicates the couple withdrew from the competition.
 indicates the couple returned to the competition after previously being eliminated.
 indicates the couple finished in the bottom two.
 indicates the couple earned immunity from elimination.
 indicates the winning couple.
 indicates the runner-up couple.
 indicates the third place couple.

Average chart

References

Let's Dance (Swedish TV series)
2021 Swedish television seasons
TV4 (Sweden) original programming